Pristothrips is a genus of thrips in the family Phlaeothripidae.

Species
 Pristothrips aaptus
 Pristothrips albipunctatus
 Pristothrips pollostus

References

Phlaeothripidae
Thrips
Thrips genera